Alma Airport  is located  south of Alma, Quebec, Canada. It mainly offers private flights, but it also has storage for private jets. Other services provided by Alma Airport are refuelling of Jet A type services, service of charters of helicopters and helicopter maintenance, service of refuelling of 100 LL type by Aviatech Products, air ambulance of the Quebec Government services, road maintenance, free parking next to the airport, and private terminals.

Airlines and destinations
The companies that operate in and from Alma Airport are UAS CE, Panorama Helicopters, Aviatech Products and Horizon Parachute.

See also
 Alma (Rivière La Grande Décharge) Water Aerodrome
 Canadian Forces Base Bagotville

References

External links
Page about this airport on COPA's Places to Fly airport directory

Alma, Quebec
Certified airports in Saguenay–Lac-Saint-Jean